William Francis Whitman Jr. (1914–2007) was a horticulturist who prospected for unusual tropical fruits around the world and helped popularize many of them in the United States. 

He was born in 1914 in Chicago, a son of Leona and William Francis Whitman Sr.. His father owned a printing company in Chicago and later developed real estate in Miami, Florida. He sailed to Tahiti, and was fascinated by the tropical fruits.

Whitman was one of the founders of The Rare Fruit Council International, then known as The Rare Fruit Council, A Tropical Study Group, based in Miami, and was its first president, from 1955 to 1960. He introduced to Florida the Kohala longan. He was also inducted into the East Coast Surfing Hall of Fame in 1998.  William got his degree from the University of Florida in administration.

Publications
Five Decades with Tropical Fruit (2001)

References
New York Times; June 4, 2007; Bill Whitman, 92, Is Dead; Scoured the Earth for Rare Fruit. William F. Whitman Jr., a self-taught horticulturist who became renowned for collecting rare tropical fruits from around the world and popularizing them in the United States, died Wednesday at his home in Bal Harbour, Florida. He was 92.

1914 births
2007 deaths
American horticulturists